Electoral district no. 9 was one of the multi-member electoral districts of the Riigikogu, the national legislature of Estonia. The district was established in 1992 when the Riigikogu was re-established following Estonia's independence from the Soviet Union. It was abolished in 1995. It was conterminous with the counties of Jõgeva and Viljandi.

Election results

Detailed

1992
Results of the 1992 parliamentary election held on 20 September 1992:

The following candidates were elected:
 Personal mandates - Priit Aimla (SK), 4,221 votes; and Matti Päts (I), 9,618 votes.
 District mandates - Tõnu Juul (I), 1,399 votes; Ilmar Mändmets (KK), 2,747 votes; Kalev Raave (KK), 1,891 votes; Jüri Rätsep (R), 2,017 votes; and Heiki Raudla (I), 880 votes.
 Compensatory mandates - Mart Nutt (I), 543 votes; and Raoul Üksvärav (KK), 1,063 votes.

References

09
Jõgeva County
09
09
Viljandi County